Anolis petersii, Peters's anole, is a species of lizard in the family Dactyloidae. The species is found in Mexico, Guatemala, and Honduras.

References

Anoles
Reptiles of Mexico
Reptiles of Guatemala
Reptiles of Honduras]
Reptiles described in 1873
Taxa named by Marie Firmin Bocourt